Cleonymia baetica is a moth of the family Noctuidae. It is found from south-western Europe and North Africa, south-east Turkey, Iraq to southwest Iran, it is also known from Saudi Arabia, Jordan, Syria and Israel.

Description
Warren (1914) states 
C. baetica Rmb. (= choenorrhini Dup., penicillata H. Sch.) (24 e). Forewing pale grey ; inner and outer lines white, vertical, towards each other edged with black, and marked by black points on veins; the inner accompanied by a dark grey cloud; the outer followed by a rufous tinge; a black spot at base of median vein; orbicular a few white scales, reniform a prominent white lunule; a tuft of white scales in middle of submedian fold ; veins towards termen broadly white, running out into the fringe ; hindwing olive brownish, the veins darker basal half whitish; fringe mottled brown and white. Found only in S. Europe; S. E. France, Spain, Sardinia;Algeria; Asia Minor, Syria, Palestine, Georgia.Larva green with yellow dorsal, red lateral and spiracular
lines; spiracles yellow ringed with dark; feeding on Helianthemum.

Subspecies
Cleonymia baetica baetica
Cleonymia baetica klapperichi (Israel)

Biology
Adults are on wing from March to April. There is one generation per year.

The larvae feed on Helianthemum species.

References

External links

Fauna Europaea
Lepiforum.de

Cuculliinae
Moths described in 1837
Moths of Europe
Moths of Asia
Moths of the Middle East
Taxa named by Jules Pierre Rambur